Eviota sebreei, common name Sebree's pygmy goby or striped dwarfgoby, is a species of fishes belonging to the family Gobiidae.

Etymology
The fish is named in honor of Capt. Uriel Sebree (1848-1922), of the U.S. Navy, he was commandant at the U.S. Naval Station Tutuila in American Samoa, and through whom the gunboat Wheeling and its equipment were placed at the describers disposal.

Distribution
This species is widespread and common throughout the Indo-Pacific Ocean, from the Red Sea, Persian Gulf and Madagascar east to Marshall Islands, Tonga and Samoa and north to southern Japan, south to Western Australia, Queensland and New Caledonia.

Habitat
These tropical marine neritic fishes are associated with clear waters coral reef,  at depths of 0 to 30 m.

Description
This species has six dorsal spines, 8-10 dorsal soft rays, one anal spine  and 8-9 anal soft rays. The dorsal/anal-fin formula is 9/8. The fifth pelvic-fin ray is about 50-80% of the fourth ray. These fishes are  characterized by a reddish longitudinal stripe in the mid-body, with a broken white line and some white spots The pectoral rays are unbranched. On the caudal fin base there is a pale-edged black spot.

Biology and behavior
These fishes usually perch on live coral of lagoon reefs and on reef-slopes, sometimes in company of some other fishes of the same species.

Bibliography
Greenfield, D. W.; Randall, J. E. (2016). A review of the dwarfgobies of Fiji, including descriptions of five new species (Teleostei: Gobiidae: Eviota). Zenodo.
Liu, J.Y. [Ruiyu] (ed.). (2008). Checklist of marine biota of China seas. China Science Press. 1267 pp.
Myers, R.F. (1991) Micronesian reef fishes., Second Ed. Coral Graphics, Barrigada, Guam. 298 p.
Randall, J.E. and M. Goren (1993) A review of the gobioid fishes of the Maldives., Ichthyol. Bull. J.L.B. Smith Inst. Ichthyol. (58):1-37, 5 pls.

References

External links
 iNaturalist
 Fishes of Australia

Taxa named by David Starr Jordan
Taxa named by Alvin Seale
Fish described in 1906
sebreei